Pitch Perfect: Original Motion Picture Soundtrack is the official music for the 2012 film Pitch Perfect. The soundtrack was released digitally on September 25, 2012, and physically on October 2, 2012. Three songs from the album charted on the Billboard Hot 100: "Cups" by Anna Kendrick, which peaked at number 6; "Bellas Finals" by the Barden Bellas, which peaked at number 85; and "Riff Off" by the Barden Bellas, the Treblemakers, and the BU Harmonics, which peaked at number 86.

The album was the sixth best-selling soundtrack of 2012, with 212,000 copies sold for the year. The album also became the best-selling soundtrack of 2013 in the United States, with 793,000 copies sold in 2013. As of April 2015, the album has sold a total of 1.2 million copies in the US.

Release and singles
The EP version of the Original Motion Picture Soundtrack was released on December 18, 2012, in iTunes and physically as a Target exclusive. The EP contains four tracks that are performed by other rival groups of the Barden Bellas and the Treblemakers.

More from Pitch Perfect was released on June 4, 2013. It contains eight tracks that are featured in the film, as well as the pop version of "Cups."  The Anna Kendrick & Brittany Snow duet of "Titanium" was not included on the soundtrack and is only available in the film.

The Ultimate Edition version of the Original Motion Picture Soundtrack was released on February 10, 2015, to coincide with the release of Pitch Perfect 2. It contains all 24 tracks from the previous three releases (Original, Special Edition, and More From).

A remixed and longer version of "Cups" by Kendrick was released to radio on March 26, 2013, and was later used as a theme song for the 2013 CONCACAF Gold Cup football tournament. In August 2013, the song peaked at number six on the Billboard Hot 100.

Track listings

More from Pitch Perfect

Charts

Weekly charts

Year-end charts

Decade-end charts

Certifications

Singles

References

2012 soundtrack albums
Albums produced by the Underdogs (production team)